Hanger Hill or Haymills Estate is a local area and ward of the London Borough of Ealing around Hanger Lane (A406 road). It was developed in the interwar period when affluent Londoners began to move out of Central London for more green spaces.  The estate features spacious  houses and flats designed by architects Douglas Smith and Barley.

Housing
The area was developed during the interwar period as two separate estates - the Hanger Hill Garden Estate and the Haymills
Estate to the east of Hanger Lane. The estates were developed to feature large, spacious family houses and flats.

The Hanger Hill Garden Estate includes Queens Drive, Links Road, Monks Drive and Princes Gardens, and was built between 1928 and 1936 to designs by architects Douglas Smith and Barley. This was designated a conservation area in 1969.

The Haymills Estate is further north, built on the site of Hanger Hill House. This estate is laid out in distinctive crescents and includes Tudor Revival, Neo-Georgian and Moderne houses. It was designated as a separate conservation area in 1996.

Amenities
Residents of the estates benefit from  Hanger Hill Garden Estate Residents Association (HHGERA) and the Hanger Hill (East) Residents Association (HHERA). The Garden Estate Residents' Association manages some of the communal gardens and service roads (those that are collectively owned by the houses part of the estate).

The nearest London Underground stations are Hanger Lane, Park Royal, West Acton and North Ealing.

The ward also features Hanger Hill Park which includes a fragment of oak woodland to the west, now a nature reserve

Nearby areas
Ealing
Richmond Upon Thames
West Twyford and Park Royal
Pitshanger and Montpelier
West Acton

References

Districts of the London Borough of Ealing
Housing estates in London